Anders Kronborg (born 18 March 1982 in Esbjerg) is a Danish politician, who is a member of the Folketing for the Social Democrats political party. He was elected into parliament in the 2019 Danish general election.

Political career
Kronborg sat in the municipal council of Esbjerg Municipality from 2005 to 2017. He was elected into parliament in the 2019 election, where he received 8,607 personal votes.

References

External links 
 Biography on the website of the Danish Parliament (Folketinget)

Living people
1982 births
People from Esbjerg
Danish municipal councillors
Social Democrats (Denmark) politicians
Members of the Folketing 2019–2022
Members of the Folketing 2022–2026